Polk Township may refer to:

Arkansas
 Polk Township, Newton County, Arkansas, in Newton County, Arkansas

Illinois
 Polk Township, Macoupin County, Illinois

Indiana
 Polk Township, Huntington County, Indiana
 Polk Township, Marshall County, Indiana
 Polk Township, Monroe County, Indiana
 Polk Township, Washington County, Indiana

Iowa
 Polk Township, Benton County, Iowa
 Polk Township, Bremer County, Iowa
 Polk Township, Jefferson County, Iowa
 Polk Township, Shelby County, Iowa, in Shelby County, Iowa
 Polk Township, Taylor County, Iowa
 Polk Township, Wapello County, Iowa

Minnesota
 Polk Centre Township, Pennington County, Minnesota

Missouri
 Polk Township, Adair County, Missouri
 Polk Township, Atchison County, Missouri
 Polk Township, Cass County, Missouri
 Polk Township, Dade County, Missouri
 Polk Township, DeKalb County, Missouri
 Polk Township, Madison County, Missouri
 Polk Township, Nodaway County, Missouri
 Polk Township, Ray County, Missouri
 Polk Township, St. Clair County, Missouri
 Polk Township, Sullivan County, Missouri

Ohio
 Polk Township, Crawford County, Ohio

Pennsylvania
 Polk Township, Jefferson County, Pennsylvania
 Polk Township, Monroe County, Pennsylvania

Township name disambiguation pages